"With You" is a song performed by American contemporary R&B singer Tony Terry; issued as the second single from his eponymous second studio album. The song is his only hit to date on the Billboard Hot 100, peaking at #14 on the chart in 1991.

Music video
 
The official music video for "With You" was directed by Blair Underwood.

Chart positions

References

External links
 
 

1990 songs
1991 singles
Epic Records singles
Music videos directed by Blair Underwood
Tony Terry songs